Brian Phillip Propp (born February 15, 1959) is a Canadian former professional ice hockey left winger who played 15 seasons in the National Hockey League (NHL), from 1979 to 1994. He featured in five Stanley Cup Finals with three different NHL teams and won the 1987 Canada Cup with Team Canada.

Playing career

Propp started his career with the Melville Millionaires of the Saskatchewan Junior Hockey League. With the Millionaires, he broke the scoring record with 75 goals and 92 assists for 168 points in 57 games, playing on a line with Kelly Dean and Dwaine Turberfield. 

He then moved on to the Brandon Wheat Kings of the WHL, a team that featured future NHLers Brad McCrimmon, Bill Derlago, Laurie Boschman, Dave Semenko, Glen Hanlon, Ray Allison, and Walt Poddubny. Propp won two league scoring titles. At the end of his third season, he was drafted 14th overall by the Philadelphia Flyers in the 1979 NHL Entry Draft.

Philadelphia Flyers

Propp made the Flyers the next season, debuting in 1979. He scored the game-winning goal in his first career game against New York Islanders goalie Billy Smith in the second period and had an assist that game, for a 2-point night. For his first 20 games, he played on a line with Reggie Leach and Bobby Clarke, before being put on a line with Ken Linseman and Paul Holmgren. It would not be the last time Propp played with two elite players, as he played with Wayne Gretzky and Mario Lemieux for most of the 1987 Canada Cup Canadian team that won the tournament.

In his rookie season, Propp would go on to beat Rick Martin's left-wing rookie scoring record with 75 points in the 1979–80 season. In the playoffs, he led all rookie left wingers in goals (5), assists (10), and points (15) in the 1980 playoffs, which the Flyers lost in Game 6 of the Stanley Cup Finals.

In 1987, Propp had scoring success when he finished runner-up to Wayne Gretzky in the 1987 Playoff scoring. He also led all left wingers that NHL post-season in games played (26), goals (12), assists (16), points (28), plus/minus (+11), power-play goals (5), short-handed goals (1), game-winning goals (3), and shots (104). The Flyers lost to the Oilers in Game 7 of the Stanley Cup Finals.

In Game 1 of the 1989 Stanley Cup playoff series against the Montreal Canadiens, which the Flyers lost in Game 6, Propp sustained a concussion from an unpenalized hit by Montreal defenseman Chris Chelios. Chelios hit him with his elbow and Propp fell to the ice, hitting his head against the ice. Though Propp missed only one game, his teammates maintained their anger at Chelios. Finally, with 1:37 left in regulation in Game 6, Flyer goaltender Ron Hextall took matters into his own hands, slamming Chelios into the boards and pummeling him with blows, apparently in retaliation for the hit on Propp. Eventually, Hextall was suspended for 12 games. This incident, as well as other injuries, continued to plague Propp throughout his career. Before the concussion incident, Propp was having a career playoff performance with 14 goals in his team's first 15 games and more than 1.5 points per game.

It took him until his 11th season score fewer than 65 points in a season, and that was the year when he was traded away by the Flyers.

In the 1980s, he led all left wingers in the NHL and was ranked first in 10 different categories: games played (750), assists (465), plus/minus (+308), game-winning goals (55), shots (2529), defensive point shares (16.0), playoff goals (52), playoff points (112), playoff power-play goals (18), and playoff shots (267).

Propp was ranked 2nd in goals (356), points (821), even-strength goals (238), shorthanded goals (20), goals created (322), offensive point shares (54.4), point shares (70.4), playoff games played (116), playoff assists (60), playoff plus/minus (+17), playoff even-strength goals (31), and playoff shorthanded goals (3). In all of the major categories in the regular season and playoffs, he has made the top 3 among left wingers a remarkable 29 times in that decade.

Boston Bruins

With the Flyers struggling and general manager Bob Clarke wanting to re-tool the club to get younger, Propp was traded at the 1990 trade deadline to the Boston Bruins where he joined long-time Flyer teammate Dave Poulin who had been dealt there six weeks before.  With the Bruins, he joined the first-place team in the league, and contributed 12 points in the final 14 games of the regular season. Propp, who was a pending free agent unlikely to return to Philadelphia the next season, appreciated former teammate Clarke sending him to a top team. "Clarkie did me a favor trading me to where we had a chance to win." The Bruins continued their success in the post-season and made a run to the Stanley Cup Final where they ultimately fell to the Edmonton Oilers. Propp chipped in four goals and 12 points in 20 playoff games.

That summer, as a free agent, Propp decided to leave the Bruins and sign with the Minnesota North Stars.

Minnesota North Stars

After his former club, the Philadelphia Flyers, missed the playoffs for the first time eighteen years following his trade, General Manager Bob Clarke was fired and soon became the General Manager of the Minnesota North Stars.  Just months after trading him away, Clarke acquired Brian Propp by signing him to a free-agent contract.

Propp enjoyed an excellent debut season in Minnesota, scoring 73 points and helping the team to an improbable run to the Stanley Cup Final, where they lost to the Pittsburgh Penguins. Propp was a huge contributor in the playoffs with 8 goals and 23 points in 23 games. Brian moved past Bobby Hull on the all-time playoff scoring list among left wingers to become the highest-scoring left winger in NHL playoff history on April.12.1991 as Minnesota North Stars beat Chicago Blackhawks 6–0 in Game 5 in the series as he scored the game-winning goal on Dominik Hasek. He was dogged by health issues the next two years and only played 68 games over those two campaigns, and even took a sabbatical to play in Switzerland in 1993. During his time in Switzerland, he played for Team Canada in the Spengler Cup and helped them to win the tournament.

Hartford Whalers

Propp suited up for one last season in the NHL, inking a free agent contract with the Hartford Whalers for the 1993–94 NHL season. Although Propp only scored 29 points, it was a productive season for him as he played both his 1000th NHL game and scored his 1000th NHL point which, fittingly, came on a goal against the Philadelphia Flyers.

During the NHL labour stoppage in 1994, Propp played as a player-coach for Anglet Hormadi Élite in France. After the lockout, however, Propp did not return to play in the National Hockey League nor did he continue his career in Europe opting instead to retire from the game.

Propp holds a dubious achievement in that he went to the Stanley Cup Finals five times, with Philadelphia in 1980, 1985, and 1987, with the Boston Bruins in 1990, and with Minnesota in 1991, without ever winning. He also played in the NHL All-Star game five times.

Propp finished with 1,004 points over 1,016 NHL games over 15 NHL seasons, and ranks second in Flyers history in goals (369, behind Bill Barber), third in assists (480, behind Bobby Clarke and Claude Giroux), and fourth overall in games played in a Flyers uniform (behind Barber, Clarke, and Giroux).

"The Guffaw"

Propp was known for his unique goal celebration dubbed "The Guffaw".  After scoring a goal, Propp would skate towards center ice, place his right glove under his left arm and raise his right arm in a waving fashion. While making the gesture, Propp would say, "Guffaw!"  Propp credits the celebration to comedian Howie Mandel.

During an Atlantic City show in 1986, Mandel used the Guffaw during his comedic routine. Mandel explained a Guffaw was when someone raised their arm and moved it back and forth. Propp adopted "The Guffaw" and it became his signature move, first appearing in the 1986–87 season.

International play
Propp has represented Canada five times in international play.
1979 World Junior Championships
1982 World Championships
1983 World Championships
1987 World/Canada Cup
1992 Spengler Cup

Post-playing career

In 1999, Propp was named to the MasterCard Canadian Junior All-Time team, which also included Mario Lemieux, Guy Lafleur, Bobby Orr, Denis Potvin, and Bernie Parent. The team was selected based on play in the Canadian Hockey League. Also in 1999, Propp was inducted into the Philadelphia Flyers Hall of Fame. Propp was inducted into the Saskatchewan Rural Hockey Hall of Fame in 2002 and in 2003 he was inducted into the Saskatchewan Provincial Hall of Fame. In 2014, Propp was inducted into the Saskatchewan Hockey Hall of Fame and the Philadelphia Sports Hall of Fame.

A resident of Cinnaminson Township, New Jersey, Propp unsuccessfully ran as a Republican in 2007 for a seat in New Jersey General Assembly in the 7th Legislative District in Burlington County. , Propp is the Director of Strategic Relationships for Wolf Commercial Real Estate in Marlton, New Jersey.

Personal life
Propp was born in Lanigan, Saskatchewan, and grew up in Neudorf, Saskatchewan. Propp and his wife have two children. Propp is a second cousin of Dylan Wruck.

In popular culture
In The Goldbergs 3rd season episode "12 Tapes For A Penny", the character Barry Goldberg (Troy Gentile) is wearing a Philadelphia Flyers jersey with Propp's name and number 26 on it.

Records

WHL
Most Goals in a single game (7)
Most Game Winning Goals in a single season (16)
Most Scoring Title's (2)
Most Consecutive Scoring Title's (2)
Most Assists by a Rookie in a single season (80)
Most Goals by a left wing in the WHL, single season (94 in 1978–79)
Most Assists by a left wing in the WHL, single season (112 in 1977–78)
Most Points by a left wing in the WHL, single season (194 in 1978–79)
Most Career Playoff Points by a left winger (77)
Most Career Hat Tricks by a left winger (13)
Most Power Play Assists by a left winger (59)

NHL
Most Career Assists by a left winger in the Playoffs (84)
Most Career Points by a left winger in the Playoffs (64 goals, 84 assists, 148 points)
Most Assists in one Playoff game in Stanley Cup Finals: (4)
Most Points by a Rookie in Stanley Cup Finals: (6) in 1980 - "Modern Era"
Most Career Power-Play Goals by a left winger in Playoffs (27)
Most Goals by a player not to make Stanley Cup Finals in Playoffs (14)

NHL franchise
Philadelphia Flyers team record for most game winning goals in a single season (12)
Philadelphia Flyers team record for most shorthanded goals in a single season (7)
Philadelphia Flyers team record for most goals in one regular season game (4)
Philadelphia Flyers team record for most power play goals in one game (3)
Philadelphia Flyers team record for most assists in a playoff game (4)
Philadelphia Flyers team record for most shots on goal in a playoff year (104)
Philadelphia Flyers team record for most games played in a playoff year (26)
Minnesota North Stars/Dallas Stars team record for most power-play goals in a playoff year (8)

Career statistics

Regular season and playoffs

International

Awards

See also
List of NHL players with 1000 points
List of NHL players with 1000 games played

References

External links
 
 Meltzer, Bill Great Moments: Brian Propp at Philadelphiaflyers.com
Total Hockey (Second Edition), Editor - Dan Diamond, 

1959 births
Living people
Anglet Hormadi Élite players
Boston Bruins players
Brandon Wheat Kings players
Canadian expatriate ice hockey players in Switzerland
Canadian ice hockey left wingers
Hartford Whalers players
HC Lugano players
Ice hockey people from Saskatchewan
Melville Millionaires players
Minnesota North Stars players
National Hockey League All-Stars
National Hockey League first-round draft picks
New Jersey Republicans
People from Cinnaminson Township, New Jersey
People from Lanigan, Saskatchewan
Philadelphia Flyers announcers
Philadelphia Flyers draft picks
Philadelphia Flyers players